Olaf Kier,  (c.1899 - 1986) was the founder of Kier Group, one of the United Kingdom's largest construction businesses.

Career
Born and educated in Denmark as Olaf Kiaer, Olaf moved to England to pursue his career. Together with Jorgen Lotz, he founded Lotz & Kier, a construction business, in 1928. The business name was changed to J.L. Kier & Co Ltd a few years later, after Lotz withdrew from the company.

In 1941 he acquired the Lexham Hall Estate near Litcham in Norfolk but, in 1945, when he saw the condition that the Army had left it in, decided to put it back on the market. He instead acquired the Cokenach Estate near Barkway in Hertfordshire. In 1965 he established the Olaf Kier Danish Charity.

He was a member of the Danish Club at 62 Knightsbridge and was awarded made CBE for industrial and social services in 1970. He died in a motor accident in May 1986 aged 87.

References

1890s births
1986 deaths
Danish emigrants to the United Kingdom
Commanders of the Order of the British Empire
Naturalised citizens of the United Kingdom
20th-century British businesspeople
People from Barkway